Douglas Knoop (1883-1948) Hon. ARIBA, was professor emeritus of economics at the University of Sheffield. With G. P. Jones, also professor of economics at Sheffield, he wrote a number of books on the history of freemasonry. A lecture is given at the university in his memory.

Selected publications

Economics
 Principles and Methods of Municipal Trading. Macmillan & Co., London, 1912.
 Outlines of Railway Economics. Macmillan & Co., 1913.

Freemasonry
All with G. P. Jones:
 The Medieval Mason
 An Introduction to Freemasonry
 The Scottish Mason and the Mason Word
 A Short History of Freemasonry
 A Handlist of Masonic Documents
 The Genesis of Freemasonry. Manchester University Press, 1947.

References 

Academics of the University of Sheffield
1883 births
1948 deaths
History of Freemasonry
British economists
Associates of the Royal Institute of British Architects